Sanghani is a surname. Notable people with the surname include:

 Dileepbhai Sanghani (born 1954), Indian politician
 Radhika Sanghani, British writer and author of Virgin and Not That Easy
 Shaun Sanghani (born 1980), American film producer and writer